Wojciechów is a village in the administrative district of Gmina Wilków, within Namysłów County, Opole Voivodeship, in south-western Poland.

The village has a population of 327.

References

Villages in Namysłów County